This is a List of World Championships medalists in sailing in multihull classes.

A-Catamaran

Dart 18

Hobie 16

Open

Women's

Hobie 17

Hobie 18

Hobie Dragoon
Megan du Plessis and Matthew Whitehead - March 2008

Hobie Tiger

See class page as per link above

Formula 16

Formula 18

M32

Nacra F18
1 Misha heemskerk with Bastiaan Tentij

Nacra 17

Tornado

Open

Mixed

References

Multihull